Renal Ramilevich Ganeyev (also spelled Ganeev; born 13 January 1985) is a Russian fencer, who has won bronze Olympic medal in the team foil competition at the 2004 Summer Olympics in Athens.

References

External links
 
  (archive)
  (archive)
 
 

1985 births
Living people
Sportspeople from Ufa
Russian male foil fencers
Fencers at the 2004 Summer Olympics
Fencers at the 2012 Summer Olympics
Olympic fencers of Russia
Olympic bronze medalists for Russia
Olympic medalists in fencing
Medalists at the 2004 Summer Olympics
Universiade medalists in fencing
Universiade gold medalists for Russia
Medalists at the 2013 Summer Universiade
21st-century Russian people